The 1962 Asian Games also known as the 4th Asian Games, IV Asiad, and Jakarta 1962, was the fourth edition of pan-Asian multi-sport event sanctioned by the Asian Games Federation (AGF). The games were held from 24 August to 4 September 1962, in Jakarta, Indonesia. It was the first international multi-sport event hosted by the then-17-year-old Southeast Asian country. This was the first of two Asian Games hosted by the city: the second was held in 2018, with Palembang as the co-host.

Israel and the Republic of China (ROC) were excluded from the Games, as in solidarity with People's Republic of China and fellow-Muslim majority countries in the Middle East, Indonesian immigration officials refused to issue entry visas for the Israeli and Taiwanese delegations.

It was a breach of the rules of the AGF, and Indonesia's own promise to invite all AGF members, including those with whom it had no diplomatic relations (Israel, ROC and the Republic of Korea).

As a result, Indonesia was suspended from the International Olympic Committee, and were subsequently excluded from the 1964 Summer Olympics. Indonesia responded to this punishment by hosting the Games of the New Emerging Forces in 1963.

A total number of 1,460 athletes, coming from 17 countries, competed in this Asiad, where badminton made its debut.

Bid
On 23 May 1958, voting for the 1962 host took place in Tokyo, Japan, before the 1958 Asian Games. The Asian Games Federation council voted 22–20 in favour of the Indonesian capital over Pakistani city of Karachi, the only other candidate.

Venues

All but three official sports were held inside or around the Gelora Bung Karno Sports Complex, temporarily called the Asian Games Complex. The shooting event was held in Cibubur Shooting Range, in what is now lies within East Jakarta. The weightlifting and wrestling events were held at Ikada Sports Hall, now demolished to make way for the National Monument. The nearby Ikada Stadium was also used for football event, as well as Tebet football pitch, located southeast of the complex. The archery demonstration event was held at Menteng Stadium.

Sports
While Weightlifting was in the program, the IWF withdrew recognition of the Asian Games competition after the Indonesian federation barred Taiwan and Israel from taking part. 

 
 
 
 
 
 
 
 

 
 
 
 
 
 
 

Exhibition sports

Participating nations
Athletes from 17 nations competed at the Jakarta Games. Sarawak made its first Asian Games appearance in 1962.

Medal table

The top ten ranked NOCs at these Games are listed below. The host nation, Indonesia, is highlighted.

Broadcasting
In Indonesia, a television station TVRI was established by the Indonesian government to broadcast the games for the general public, which was the first in the country. The station would become the main channel of TVRI network; and its first airdate, which coincides with the opening ceremony, become the network's founding date.

References

External links

 

 
Asian Games
Asian Games
Asian Games by year
Sports competitions in Jakarta
Asian Games, 1962
Multi-sport events in Indonesia
Asian Games
20th century in Jakarta
August 1962 sports events in Asia
September 1962 sports events in Asia
Islam and antisemitism
Asian Games in Indonesia